Robert Taylor (1944 – December 11, 2014) was an American Primetime Emmy Award-winning animator, writer, producer and film director.

Taylor's credits include such films and television series as The Nine Lives of Fritz the Cat, The Flintstone Kids, It's Flashbeagle, Charlie Brown, Challenge of the GoBots, Challenge of the Super Friends, Bonkers, Goof Troop, Aladdin and the King of Thieves, TaleSpin and Heidi's Song''.

He died in Woodland Hills, California on December 11, 2014, from complications due to COPD.

References

External links

1944 births
2014 deaths
American film directors
American animators
American television writers
American male screenwriters
American television producers
American animated film directors
American animated film producers
Primetime Emmy Award winners
American male television writers